Dentata is Latin for "toothed" and may refer to:
 Alternanthera dentata, an ornamental plant of the amaranth family
 Fascia dentata, the earliest stage of the hippocampal circuit in the brain
 Vagina dentata, the myth of the "toothed vagina"

See also 
 Dentatus (disambiguation)
 Dentatum